Bayliss is an unincorporated community in Glenn County, California.

The ZIP Code, shared with Ordbend and Glenn, is 95943. The community is inside area code 530.

Emergency services are provided by the Bayliss Volunteer Fire Department.

Bayliss Carnegie Library
The most notable feature of Bayliss is one of the last operational Carnegie libraries located at 7830 County Road 39.

References

Unincorporated communities in California
Unincorporated communities in Glenn County, California